Tettigonia caudata is a species of bush-crickets  belonging to the family Tettigoniidae subfamily Tettigoniinae. It is found over most of Europe mainly in the East (it is absent from France and Spain). The males of this species prefer to inhabit tall and dense vegetation. This mesohabitat can be compared to that of the T. viridissima which it competes with.

References

Reference information
Reference number one was provided by the journal Biologia which publishes research papers covering botany, zoology, and cellular biology.

Orthoptera of Europe
Tettigoniinae
Insects described in 1842